Jesse Alfred Wallingford (25 January 1872 – 6 June 1944) was a British sport shooter, who competed in the 1908 Summer Olympics.

In the 1908 Olympics he won a bronze medal in the team pistol event. He was also fifth in the individual pistol event, sixth in team free rifle event and tenth in 300 m free rifle event. The same year he set a mad minute record, scoring 36 hits in one minute on a 48-inch target at 300 yards. He was a sniper when the Great War broke out and taught numerous soldiers how to shoot.

At the 1899 International Shooting Sport Federation World Championships in Loosdoinen, Belgium, he won the Gold Medal in 300 metres free rifle prone 40 shots, men.

Military service and Gallipoli
Prior to 1915 as Assistant Adjutant, Auckland Infantry Battalion, he supervised the work of training the Expeditionary Force in rifle practice at Penrose, Auckland, and left for Europe with the main body of the force. He was brought to NZ by the Government in 1911 direct from the School of Musketry, Hythe, England, to act as instructor to the New Zealand territorial forces. He was six times the rifle champion of the British Empire, twice revolver champion and five times was second in the revolver championship. He was twice the winner of the Prince of Wales’ £100 prize, one of the biggest shooting trophies in the world. [Auckland Weekly News 10.06.1915, p. 21]

He won a Military Cross for his actions at Gallipoli in 1915.  Officially his citation of 3 July 1915, p6541 states:
"On 25th and 26th April, 1915, during operations near Gaba Tepe, for exceptionally good service with the New Zealand Brigade machine-gun and sharpshooters, and for conspicuous coolness and resource on several critical occasions."

The action for which he received the award were recorded in The Auckland Regiment by OE Burn in 1922:
On the afternoon of the 27th, Wallingford greatly distinguished himself. The position above Walker's was obscure, doubtful and dangerous. Arriving on the scene, he found that the casualties had been very heavy, that the Turks had obtained complete superiority of fire and were apparently massing, ready to storm over the disheartened few who were still holding on. No one was in charge. In perilous times the boldest measures are always the best. Wallingford saw that to attack, to get on the offensive, was the only thing that could save the situation. He told the men around that he was going forward. It seemed certain death, but he made the venture, not knowing whether any would follow. Twenty yards for-ward, thirty yards—and the Turkish fire was very hot for-ward still, and then down in a little patch of partially dead ground. Here, between the lines was a machine-gun. It was jammed and out of order; belt and spare parts were lying around in confusion. The crew had been killed, with the exception of Preston, who, wounded as he was, stayed by his gun, although he could not put it to rights. For the master gunner it was but a moment's work, and the gun was rattling away, "Rat-tat-tat, rat-tat-tat," and the Turks who were a moment ago insolently showing themselves were shot down. For hours Wallingford and Preston held on, despite every effort of the Turks to dislodge them. The deadly rifle of the great marksman, and the still more deadly bursts of machine-gun fire made short work of any venturesome Turks who dared to show themselves. Their fire slackened. Then the worn-out men behind took fresh courage, and came round the machine-gun. The position was once more secure. It was characteristic of Captain Wallingford that his next business was to get the wounded clear. With the exception of Dr. Craig, no man was ever keener on salvaging the poor broken sufferers on the battlefield than this fighting soldier, of whom it is literally true to say that, like Saul of old, "he had slain his thousands." In those early critical days the fiery enthusiasm, the tireless energy, the stark valour of this man were invaluable. It was he "who gave us the courage."
And at The Apex, Gallipoli 10 August 1915:

As darkness fell on the 9th, the hope of victory had almost vanished. If the remnant of the crest of Chunuk could still be held...first it was necessary to obtain more men and more ammunition. It was now four days since the beginning of the struggle. The Turks had called up all their reserves. Thousands had crossed from Asia, and other thousands had come down from Bulair. All night they were massing behind Sari Bair, and on the morning of the 10th the whole mass was in motion, moving with the power of an avalanche and the speed of a landslide.... The Turks came on. The hill-side was brown with their charging battalions.... For a moment it seemed that no power on earth could stop the moving mass, but the target they made was a good one. Aucklanders on Cheshire Ridge were firing—firing as fast as they could load and fire—and with them now were the Fifth Reinforcements. The Turks came on, three hundred men in a line, and twenty lines, following at a little space one behind the other. ... Wallingford had ten machine-guns in action....They were trained across the line of the Turkish advance. The men behind, cool and resolute, set up a zone of death. The first line of Turks charged into it and went down to a man. The next line melted away on the same spot. But still they came on, line after line, and the leaden sweep reaped them in swathes. No hesitation; no faltering; the last line charged on with the same high courage. They also fall.

Captain Wallingford "I have stated they were 20 yards distance at one pace intervals and the lines were 300yards long and that we were firing for 30 minutes, the last line arriving and suffering in the death zone exactly similar to the first..it has been stated that thousands came down and hundreds walked back.  None walked back.  A fair number crawled back but in no case did the guns molest them.  I gave permission to shoot any that may walk but it was unnecessary as the only men to move crawled" and estimated that 5,000 Turks were killed in the charge. (Stowers, Richard, Bloody Gallipoli: The New Zealanders' Story. David Bateman: Auckland, 2005)

A Poverty Bay Herald article on 16 September 1915 stated:

CAPTAIN WALLINGFORD SHOOTS OVER 700 TURKS.  Most people have heard already of the prowess of Captain Wallingford, who was, and probably still is, the finest shot in the British Army. The British Army claims that he is the greatest shot in the world. A member of his company, who has come back to New Zealand with a wound which almost proved mortal, relates with pride some of Captain Wallingford's exploits. In a letter home, it may be remembered that this officer wrote that after several weeks at the front, that day was the first on which he had not killed a Turk. This mail left the front on June 27th and he claims that Captain. Wallingford's 'tally' up to that time with the rifle alone, leaving out of account altogether the terrible machine-gun, was over 700. As a marksman he is a wizard. One incident this, soldier related; "Do you see that bush there?" said Captain Wallingford one day, pointing to a harmless looking bush about 60 yards away. "Well watch it." They watched, and saw that it moved very slowly. "I think we'll give him a chance" said Captain Wallingford, which meant that instead of using his rifle, he would use a revolver. He drew his revolver and fired quick as a flash. The animated bush collapsed, and the Turk that it hid rolled over quite dead. On another occasion Captain Wallingford played one of his practical jokes on the Turks in the opposing trenches. "I think "we'll make the beggars waste some ammunition presently", he said. Then he passed the word that when he shouted an order the company was to fire five rounds rapid, and then stop. As the narrator tells: 'We fired our five rounds rapid in five seconds or so, and they kept on firing for an hour and a-quarter expecting us to attack. We stayed snug in our trench of course. Afterwards Captain Wallingford said 'I guess" we've got more ammunition left than they aye' This joke was practised very often with good effect in the first months, but now the Turk is more wary, and probably ammunition is more scarce."

Family
Jessie Alfred Wallingford born 25 June 1871 and was the second of ten children born to Frederick Plumroy Wallingford- born 27 Jan 1839, and Phoebe Holloway, born 1846. Jessie died on 6 June 1944 (coincidentally, on D-Day). He married Alice Bishopp - born 1871, in 1897 and they had four children: 
Sidney, born in 1898 in England, died 1978 in Whitianga New Zealand (2 children),
Cecil, born 1901 and died 1902 in Hythe, England,
Ena, born 1 Jan 1903, died 14 Feb 1972 in Auckland, New Zealand (2 children), and Roland born 12 November 1906, died 12 November 1980 (5 children).  
(www.clanmacfarlanegenealogy.info)

References

External links
profile
Gallipoli, 1915 photograph, Alexander Turnbull Library
Burn, OE, The Auckland Regiment 1922 at NZETC
Poverty Bay Herald 16 Sept 1915

1872 births
1944 deaths
British male sport shooters
ISSF rifle shooters
ISSF pistol shooters
Olympic shooters of Great Britain
Shooters at the 1908 Summer Olympics
Olympic bronze medallists for Great Britain
Olympic medalists in shooting
Medalists at the 1908 Summer Olympics
British Army personnel of World War I
Recipients of the Military Cross